is a Japanese actress, singer and columnist who is a former member of the female idol group SDN48.

Natsuko is represented with Asia Business Partners. Her twin sister is Akiko, who is also an actress.

SDN48 works

Singles

Stage performances

As Natsuaki

Works

Videos

Filmography

TV dramas

Variety

Films

Stage

Advertisements

Radio

Online

Bibliography

Photo albums

Magazines

References

External links
 
 – Ameba (18 July 2009 –) 
Sirabee (updated every Saturday) 
 (Every Tuesday) 
 (Updated from five to twenty days) 
 

Japanese actresses
Japanese columnists
Japanese twins
Actors from Chiba Prefecture
1989 births
Living people
Japanese women columnists